Ian Cole is an English karateka. He has medalled at multiple European Karate Championships and World Karate Championships, and won the gold medal for men's open-weight kumite at the 1997 World Games.

References

Year of birth missing (living people)
Living people
Black British sportsmen
English male karateka
World Games gold medalists
World Games silver medalists
World Games bronze medalists
Competitors at the 1989 World Games
Competitors at the 1993 World Games
Competitors at the 1997 World Games
World Games medalists in karate